Mejia is a village in Mejia CD block in the Bankura Sadar subdivision of the Bankura district  in the state of West Bengal, India.

Geography

Location

Area overview
The map alongside shows the Bankura Sadar subdivision of Bankura district. Physiographically, this area is part of the Bankura Uplands in the west gradually merging with the Bankura-Bishnupur Rarh Plains in the north-east. The western portions are characterised by undulating terrain with many hills and ridges. The area is having a gradual descent from the Chota Nagpur Plateau. The soil is laterite red and hard beds are covered with scrub jungle and sal wood. Gradually it gives way to just uneven rolling lands but the soil continues to be lateritic. There are coal mines in the northern part, along the Damodar River. It is a predominantly rural area with 89% of the population living in rural areas and only 11% living in the urban areas.

Note: The map alongside presents some of the notable locations in the subdivision. All places marked in the map are linked in the larger full screen map.

Demographics
According to the 2011 Census of India, Mejia had a total population of 5,308 of which 2,772 (52%) were males and 2,536 (48%) were females. Population below 6 years was 620. The total number of literates in Mejia was 3,592 (76.62% of the population over 6 years).

Civic administration

CD block HQ
The headquarters of Mejia CD block are located at Mejia.

Police station
Mejia police station has jurisdiction over Mejia CD block. The area covered is 162.90 km2 and the population covered is 76,123.

Economy

Industries
Sova Ispat Limited, at Mejia, produces sponge iron, rolled products, ferro alloys and pig iron and has a captive power plant. It employs 5,000 people. Ma Amba Sponge Iron Pvt. Ltd. employs 250 people.

Transport
National Highway 14, (old numbering NH 60), running from Morgram to Kharagpur, passes through Mejia.

Education
The Government General Degree College, now renamed Kabi Jagadram Government General Degree College, at Gopalpur village, PO Mejia, was established in 2015. It is offering honours courses in Bengali, English, economics, history, philosophy, geology, physics, mathematics and accountancy.

Mejhia High School is a Bengali-medium coeducational school established in 1930. It has facilities for teaching from class V to class XII. The school has 10 computers, 2,500 books in the library and a playground.

Mejhia Girls High School is a Bengali-medium girls only school established in 1968. It has facilities for teaching from class V to class XII. The school has 10 computers, 1,000 books in the library and a playground.

Healthcare
Mejia Block Primary Health Centre, with 25 beds at Mejia, is the major government medical facility in Mejia CD block. There are primary health centres at Ramchandrapur (with 4 beds) and Pairasol (with 10 beds).

References

Villages in Bankura district